Lindström (also spelled Lindstrom) is a city in Chisago County, Minnesota, United States, located 35 miles northeast of the Twin Cities.  The population was 4,442 at the 2010 census.  Lindström's motto is America's Little [Sweden]. U.S. Highway 8 serves as a main route for the community.

Geography

When looking at the town from above, it looks like it could be an island due to the surrounding lakes. The landmass of Lindström consists mainly of lakes (including South Lindström Lake, North Lindström Lake, and Green Lake). With so many lakes, Lindström is a destination for fishers from all over the world.

History

Lindström was settled predominantly by Swedish (and a few Norwegian) immigrants and their families. In 1853, Daniel Lindström left Sweden in search of a nice piece of land to settle in the United States. Lindström was platted in 1880. The town of Lindström was incorporated in 1894. Many other Swedish emigrants traveled with Daniel Lindström.  Joris Per Anderson, half brother to Daniel Lindström, came in 1850 leading a party from Hassela, Sweden.  In the party was Erik Norelius, whose personal journals in part formed the basis of Vilhelm Moberg’s novels of the Swedish emigration to the United States, The Emigrants.  Moberg's novels have two main characters, Karl Oskar and Kristina Nilsson. The novels depict the hardships Swedish emigrants endured en route to the United States.  A bronze statue of the author, holding his bicycle as if ready to ride away, stands on a stepped platform in Chisago City’s town park. An image of Karl Oskar and Kristina remains Lindström’s logo today.  Since 1990, anyone who has taken U.S. Highway 8 from north of Forest Lake to Lindström has driven on the Moberg Trail.

Lindström celebrates Karl Oskar and Kristina annually with Karl Oskar Days. This event takes place mid-July and includes such activities as the coronation of a "Karl Oskar Princess", parades, a street dance, and fireworks. There are still statues of Karl Oskar and Kristina in Lindström, as a tribute to the early Swedish immigrants whose descendants continue to populate the area. These statues are the main attraction for tourists from all over the world who come to Lindström because of its Swedish heritage.

In April 2015, Minnesota Governor Mark Dayton signed an executive order to restore the umlaut (¨) over the "o" on the Lindström city limits sign.
(However, both the USGS and the US Census Bureau record the city's name as "Lindstrom".)

Education
Lindström is part of the Chisago Lakes School District #2144.  There are five schools in the area, which accommodate around 3,600 students in grades K–12.  The five schools in the district include Primary School (Grades Pre-K to 1), Lakeside School (Grades 2 to 5), Taylors Falls Elementary (Grades K to 5), Chisago Lakes Middle School (Grades 6 to 8), and Chisago Lakes High School (Grades 9 to 12). The school mascot is the Wildcat.

Demographics

2020 census
As of the census of 2020, there were 4,888 people and 1,699 households. 95.3% of residents had at least a high school education, and 30.1% had attained a Bachelor's degree or higher. 6.4% were veterans.

93.0% of residents were born in the United States, and 77.3% had been born in Minnesota. Among the foreign-born population, 37.6% had been born in Northern America, 32.0% in Latin America, and 30.4% in Asia. 94.6% of residents spoke only English at home, and 3.7% spoke Spanish.

The racial makeup of the city was 93.0% White alone (97.7% White alone or in combination), 0.9% Asian, 0.7% Black, 0.1% Native American, and 0.5% some other race. 4.8% were two or more races. 1.9% were Hispanic or Latino of any race. The most common ancestries in Lindström were German (42.8%),  Norwegian (22.2%), Swedish (21.5%), Irish (9.4%), and Polish (4.8%).

Among workers 16 years and older, 76.8% commuted to work via car, 9.8% carpooled, 0.9% used public transit, and 7.8% worked from home.  The median household income in Lindström was $103,102, above the state average. 5.7% of residents lived below the poverty line. 83.4% of housing in the city was owner-occupied.

The average family size in Lindström was 3.11 persons, and 59.6% of households were married-couple families.

2010 census
As of the census of 2010, there were 4,442 people, 1,774 households, and 1,265 families residing in the city. The racial makeup of the city was 97.0% White, 0.4% African American, 0.2% Native American, 0.6% Asian, 0.3% from other races, and 1.4% from two or more races. Hispanic or Latino of any race were 1.2% of the population.

There were 1,774 households, of which 34.2% had children under the age of 18 living with them, 56.9% were married couples living together, 9.9% had a female householder with no husband present, 4.6% had a male householder with no wife present, and 28.7% were non-families. 23.5% of all households were made up of individuals, and 11.5% had someone living alone who was 65 years of age or older. The average household size was 2.50 and the average family size was 2.96.

The median age in the city was 39.1 years. 25.8% of residents were under the age of 18; 5.6% were between the ages of 18 and 24; 26.7% were from 25 to 44; 25.5% were from 45 to 64; and 16.2% were 65 years of age or older. The gender makeup of the city was 49.9% male and 50.1% female.

2000 census
As of the census of 2000, there were 3,015 people, 1,225 households, and 855 families residing in the city. The racial makeup of the city was 97.61% White, 0.20% African American, 0.36% Native American, 0.50% Asian, 0.56% from other races, and 0.76% from two or more races. Hispanic or Latino of any race were 1.13% of the population. 25.1% were of German, 22.8% Swedish, 12.8% Norwegian, 7.9% French and 6.3% Irish ancestry according to Census 2000. 100.0% spoke English as their first language.

There were 1,225 households, out of which 31.1% had children under the age of 18 living with them, 58.4% were married couples living together, 8.2% had a female householder with no husband present, and 30.2% were non-families. 25.7% of all households were made up of individuals, and 13.6% had someone living alone who was 65 years of age or older.  The average household size was 2.46 and the average family size was 2.95.

In the city, the population was spread out, with 26.0% under the age of 18, 6.8% from 18 to 24, 26.5% from 25 to 44, 22.5% from 45 to 64, and 18.1% who were 65 years of age or older.  The median age was 39 years. For every 100 females, there were 95.8 males.  For every 100 females age 18 and over, there were 90.7 males.

The median income for a household in the city was $44,980, and the median income for a family was $50,519. Males had a median income of $42,604 versus $28,163 for females. The per capita income for the city was $21,195.  About 5.7% of families and 8.0% of the population were below the poverty line, including 8.6% of those under age 18 and 13.9% of those age 65 or over.

Sister cities
  Tingsryd, Sweden

See also
 Chisago Lakes School District
 Swedish Americans
 Norwegian Americans
 Nordic Americans
 Ö

References

External links

 City of Lindstrom
 Lindstrom Community Profile
 Vilhelm Moberg
 Lindstrom, Minnesota at the Minnesota Historical Society. 
 Karl Oskar Days 2012

Cities in Chisago County, Minnesota
Cities in Minnesota
Swedish-American culture in Minnesota